Leetonia High School (LHS) is a public high school in Leetonia, Ohio, United States. It is the only high school in the Leetonia Exempted Village School District. Athletic teams compete as the Leetonia Bears in the Ohio High School Athletic Association as a member of the Eastern Ohio Athletic Conference.

Academics
According to the National Center for Education Statistics, in 2019, the school reported an enrollment of 298 pupils in grades 7th through 12th, with 3 pupils eligible for a federal free or reduced-price lunch. The school employed 16.00 teachers, yielding a student–teacher ratio of 18.62.

Leetonia High School offers courses in the traditional American curriculum. 

Entering their third and fourth years, students can elect to attend the Columbiana County Career and Technical Center in Lisbon as either a part time student, taking core courses at LHS, while taking career or technical education at the career center, or as a full time student instead. Students may choose to take training in automotives, construction technology, cosmetology, culinary arts, health sciences, information technology, multimedia, landscape & environmental design, precision machining, veterinary science, and welding. 

A student must earn 28 credits to graduate, including: 4 credits in a mathematics sequence, 3 credits in science, including life and physical science, 4 credits in English, 3 credits in a social studies sequence, 1 credit in fine art, 1 credit in health and physical education, 1 credit in personal finance, and 4.5 elective credits. Elective courses can be in English, science, social studies, foreign language, technology and business, family and consumer science, and fine art. Students attending the career center follow the same basic requirements, but have requirements in career & technical education rather than fine arts. All students must pass Ohio state exams in English I & II, Algebra I, Geometry, Biology, American History, and American Government, or the like.

Athletics

OHSAA State Championships 

 Boys' track and field – 1984

References

External links 
 

High schools in Columbiana County, Ohio
Public high schools in Ohio